Peter Charles Geoffrey Jackson (4 March 1922, in Brighton – 2 May 2003, in Northwood, London) was a British artist noted for his cartoon strip 'London is Stranger Than Fiction'.

Career
Jackson showed a talent for illustration from childhood. He attended Hove High School and then Willesden School of Art.

He submitted some sketches to the newspaper unsolicited in 1949 and through a lucky coincidence the paper was looking for an artist to do a strip about London at that time. He was hired and the strip become a success, giving rise to books of compilations of his work.  The London Is Stranger Than Fiction strip ran every Wednesday in the London Evening News newspaper. The strip featured quirky and little known historical facts about London in an easy to read illustrated cartoon strip. The strip ran continuously from 1949 until the paper closed for good in 1980.

He also authored the "Saul of Tarsus" cartoon, which appeared in the first issues of the Eagle comic and reflected Jackson's religious faith. His work also appeared in the children's educational comics Look and Learn  and Treasure .

Jackson also became a notable collector of antiques and documents relating to the history of London. The Ephemera Society, presented Jackson with the Samuel Pepys Medal for his contribution to ephemera studies. He co-authored a number of books on London and its history with Felix Barker.

Personal life
Peter Jackson married Valerie Harris in 1995.  He is buried at Highgate Cemetery (West).

References

1922 births
2003 deaths
Artists from Brighton
British comics artists
British comics writers
British illustrators
Eagle (comic)
Burials at Highgate Cemetery